Prayag Mukundan is an Indian cinematographer who works in Malayalam, Kannada and Hindi cinema. He is an alumnus of I-MET VFX & Animation Film School & Neo Film School, Kochi. He was mentored by known vfx director Biju Dhanapalan and  cinematographers like C. K. Muraleedharan ISC, Jain Joseph, Sujith Vaassudev and Sudheer Palsane. Prayag have done cinematography for documentaries, short films and research projects for IIT Bombay His debut feature as Director of photography is called Emergency Exit that titled as  Thurthu Nirgamana in Kannada language.

Early life
Prayag was born in Kuttiyattoor, Kannur, Kerala. He schooled in I.M.N.S.G.H.S.S, Mayyil, Kannur. He is active in making and experimenting pinhole cameras.

References 

‘Thurthu Nirgamana’ movie review: A unique coming-of-age fantasy drama 
പ്രയാഗിന്‍റെ സിനിമ പ്രയാണം...
PRAYAG MUKUNDAN 
Exclusive: A unique 360 degree hyper lapse shot in Thurthu Nirgamana 
The VFX work in Thurthu Nirgamana took 11 months 
'സന്തോഷ് ശിവനെ പരിചയപ്പെടാന്‍ മുംബൈയില്‍ ചെന്ന പ്രയാഗിനു മനസിലായി, ഒന്നും അത്ര എളുപ്പമല്ല..'
Thurthu Nirgamana 
Sudesh Balan's short film ‘Saakshatkaaram’ to be screened at MIFF 
എമർജൻസി എക്സിറ്റിലൂടെ പ്രയാഗിന്‍റെ എൻട്രി

External links 
 
 https://hindisip.com/thurthu-nirgamana-movie-review-a-unique-coming-of-age-fantasy-drama-filmyzoo/
 https://news.bharattimes.co.in/thurthu-exodus-movie-review-a-unique-upcoming-fantasy-drama/
 https://watch.eventive.org/dcsaff/play/6193f5ccd93cff00a2823803/61841f6ee1c20c0062a99dff
 https://www.youtube.com/watch?v=nPNHxt6k24Q
 https://www.filmibeat.com/celebs/prayag-mukundan.html
 https://thetimesbureau.com/a-one-of-a-kind-360-degree-hyperlapse-taken-in-thurthu-nirgamana-202206/
 https://www.asianage.com/music/visual-poetry-360-degrees-454
 https://www.news9live.com/entertainment/movie-review/thurthu-nirgamana-review-delightful-take-on-life-and-living-as-told-through-story-of-a-dead-man-178433
 https://timesofindia.indiatimes.com/entertainment/malayalam/music/mollywood-singers-come-together-for-a-beautiful-medley-of-lullabies/articleshow/76245638.cms?from=mdr

1991 births
Living people
Malayalam film cinematographers
21st-century Indian photographers
Cinematographers from Kerala